The Treasurer of the Northern Territory is the title held by the Northern Territory Government cabinet minister who is responsible for the financial management of Northern Territory's budget sector.

List of treasurers of the Northern Territory
The following individuals have served as the Treasurer of the Northern Territory, or any precursor title:

List of Executive Members for Finance
In the period prior to 1978, the responsible government of the Northern Territory was administered via the Australian Government Department of the Northern Territory. During a transition period between 1974 and 1978, the following individuals served as the Executive Member for Finance:

References

Northern Territory
 
Northern Territory-related lists
Ministers of the Northern Territory government